Major James Francis Thomas (25 July 1861 – 11 November 1942), was a solicitor from Tenterfield, New South Wales.

As Major Thomas, he defended Lieutenants Peter Joseph Handcock, George Ramsdale Witton, and Harry "Breaker" Morant, of the Bushveldt Carbineers (BVC) of the British Army, in their trial for the murder of nine Boer prisoners-of-war during the Second Boer War.

Education
He was educated at The King's School, Parramatta, and at the University of Sydney.

Law
He served as an articled clerk in a reputable Sydney law practice.

He was (unconditionally) admitted to practise as a solicitor on 28 May 1887.

Tenterfield Star
He was also the owner-operator of the Tenterfield Star newspaper for sixteen years, from 1898.

Death
He died on his property at Boonoo Boonoo, near Tenterfield, on Remembrance Day, 11 November 1942.

See also
 Court-martial of Breaker Morant
 Pardon for Morant, Handcock and Witton
 Discovery of Breaker Morant relics

Footnotes

References
 New State of Provinces?,  The Richmond River Express and Casino Kyogle Advertiser, (Wednesday, 27 August 1924), p.3.
 N. S. Wales Doubting Thomas: Life Struggles of Spirited Lawyer: Man Who Fought Kitchener" Thentefield Solicitor Remains in Gaol on Principle, Smith's Weekly, (Saturday, 11 June 1927), p.11.
 Struck off the Rolls,  Casino and Kyogle Courier and North Coast Advertiser, (Wednesday, 14 Mar 1928), p.3. 
 Tenterfield's Fighting Solicitor, Smith's Weekly, (Saturday, 8 September 1928), p.4.
 Unkles, James, Ready, Aim, Fire : Major James Francis Thomas, the Fourth Victim in the Execution of Lieutenant Harry "Breaker" Morant, Sid Harta Publishers, (Glen Waverley), 2018. 
 Witton, G.R., Scapegoats of the Empire, Angus & Robertson, (Sydney), (1907).
NAA: A1336, 227: Copyright Application by George Ramsdale Whitton for Scapegoats of the Empire, dated 7 August 1907, National Archives of Australia, (contains photographs of each of the book's 240 pages).

External links
 
 James Francis Thomas – The Man Who Defended Breaker Morant, The Australian Light Horse Association.
 Major James Thomas, The Australian Boer War Memorial, Anzac Parade Canberra.
 Boer War Nominal Roll: James Francis Thomas.
 Opinion of the Hon. Isaac A. Isaacs, K.C., M.P., re the case of Lieutenant Witton, 1902, Melbourne : [s.n.]

1861 births
1942 deaths
Australian Army officers
Australian military personnel of the Second Boer War
19th-century Australian lawyers
Australian newspaper publishers (people)
20th-century Australian lawyers